The Foss and Wells House is a historic Italianate house located in Jordan, Minnesota. It was listed on the National Register of Historic Places on April 17, 1980.

Description and history 
It was built with local sandstone in 1858. Foss and Wells operated a nearby flour and gristmill.

References

External links
National Register Nomination Form

Houses completed in 1858
Houses in Scott County, Minnesota
Houses on the National Register of Historic Places in Minnesota
National Register of Historic Places in Scott County, Minnesota
Italianate architecture in Minnesota